Chantal is a feminine given name of French origin. The name Chantal can be traced back to the Old Occitan word cantal, meaning "stone." It came into popular use as a given name in honor of the Catholic saint, Jeanne de Chantal. It may also be spelled Chantel, Chantalle,  Chantelle, Shantal, Shantel, or Shantelle usually in the USA. In Europe and Quebec, the name is generally pronounced as "Chantal".

Chantal
Chantal Akerman (born 1950), Belgian film maker
Chantal Botts (born 1976), South African badminton player
Chantal Chamandy, Canadian singer
Chantal Chawaf (born 1943), French writer
Chantal Coché (1826 – 1891), Belgian industrialist
Chantal Claret (born 1982), American singer
Chantal Galladé (born 1972), Swiss politician
Chantal Garrigues (1944–2018), French actress
Chantal Goya (born 1942), French singer and actress
Chantal Grevers (born 1961), Dutch cricketer
Chantal Groot (born 1982), Dutch swimmer
Chantal Joffe (born 1969), English painter
Chantal Kreviazuk (born 1974), Canadian singer-songwriter
Chantal Mauduit (1964–1998), French alpine skier
Chantal Mouffe (born 1943), Belgian political theorist
Chantal Nijkerken-de Haan (born 1973), Dutch politician
Chantal Quesnel, Canadian actress
Chantal Passamonte (born 1970), South African electronic musician, better known as Mira Calix
Chantal Réga (born 1955), French sprinter
Chantal Renaud (born 1946), Canadian script writer
Chantal Serre
Chantal Singer, Canadian internationally ranked waterskier
Chantal Spitz (born 1954), French Polynesian author
Chantal Strand (born 1987), Canadian voice actress
Chantal Strasser (born 1978), Swiss freestyle swimmer
Chantal Sutherland (born 1976), Canadian model, television personality and jockey
Chantal Ughi (born 1981), Italian female kick boxer, actress and multiple Muay Thai champion
Marie-Chantal, Crown Princess of Greece (born 1968), the wife of Pavlos, a crowned prince of Greece
Chantal Videla (born 2002), Filipino-Argentine actress, model, and singer of K-pop girl group Lapillus (group)

Chantel

Chantelle

Chantalle
Chantalle Ng (born 1995), Singaporean actress
Chantalle Zijderveld (born 2000), Dutch swimmer

Shantal
Shantal Munro-Knight, Barbadian politician
Beatriz Shantal, Mexican actress, singer, and model
Ran Shantal (born 1971), Israeli Olympic competitive sailor

Shantel
Stefan Hantel, stage name Shantel (born 1968), German DJ and producer
Shantel Bailey (born 1995), Jamaican footballer
Shantel Jordan, U.S. figure skater
Shantel Krebs (born 1973), American businesswoman and former South Dakota Secretary of State
Shantel Rivard, the first coach for the University of North Dakota's Fighting Sioux women's hockey team
Shantel VanSanten (born 1985), American actress and model

Shantelle
Shantelle Larissa Malawski (born 1986), Canadian professional wrestler with the ring name Taylor Wilde

See also 
Chantelle (disambiguation)

French feminine given names